Einar Oscar Schou ( 4 June 1877 - 28 December 1966) was a Norwegian architect. He is most noted for his design of Den Nationale Scene in Bergen, Norway.

Background
Einar Oscar Schou was born in Kristiania, Norway. He studied at the Royal Drawing School from 1898 to 1901. He was assistant to the architect Halfdan Berle in Oslo from 1899-1901. He studied at the Art Academy in Stockholm between 1901-1903. After graduation, he became head of the Agi Lindgren architectural firm in Stockholm and was there for three years. In 1907, he founded his own architectural practice and ran this until after World War II. From 1935-51, he was director of the Bergen Arts School (Bergens kunsthåndverksskole), now part of the Bergen National Academy of the Arts.

Career

His best known work is the design of the theatre Den Nationale Scene at Engen in Bergen. In 1904, he won the competition for the theater building, where his proposal was preferred over veteran  Bergen-based architect, Henrik Bull. The theater building designed by Schou opened on 19 February 1909, with King Haakon VII of Norway and Queen Maud in attendance. The hall, foyer and lobby were largely destroyed during World War II. In 2001 the building was brought back almost to its original shape.

Schou was Chairman of the Bergen Art Society 1914-15. He served on the Bergen city council for the Norwegian Conservative Party from 1929 to 1937 and was a member of a number of Bergen municipal councils and committees. Schou was decorated Knight, First Class of the Royal Norwegian Order of St. Olav in 1909. Schou earned the Houen Foundation Award in 1912.

References

Other sources
Aarseth, Asbjørn  Den Nationale Scene : 1901-31 (Oslo: Gyldendal. 1969)

1877 births
1966 deaths
Architects from Bergen
Norwegian expatriates in Sweden
Artists from Oslo
Politicians from Bergen
Conservative Party (Norway) politicians
Academic staff of the Bergen Academy of Art and Design